The Jockey Club Cup (Hong Kong) is a set weights Group 2 Thoroughbred horse race in Hong Kong, run at Sha Tin over a distance of 2000 metres in November. 

The winner, first runner-up and second runner-up would enjoy the privilege of engaging in Hong Kong Cup, which is a Group one race carried out in early December. This race was established in 2002, while named " International Cup Trial". In the 2003/2004 racing season, this race was upgraded to a domestic Group 2 event. The race was promoted to International Group 2 status in 2010. After the seasons, the race was renamed "Jockey Club Cup", which is the name that still in use today. The prize money in season 2011/12 is HK$3,000,000, which was increased to HK$3,875,000 in season 2014/15. 

As Hong Kong Jockey Club has not set up any trials for Hong Kong Vase, which is another feature Group one race in Hong Kong International Race Day. Those who have an intention of participating in Hong Kong Vase would take part in this race for the Vase. Dominant, the winner of Hong Kong Vase in 2013, took the exactly same way before savouring the sweet taste of victory in the Vase. On the other hand, although Hong Kong Jockey Club has reserved four quotes for overseas contenders per year since 2009, there are no non-Hong Kong-based horses trying to claim the title by far.

Winners

See also
 List of Hong Kong horse races

References
Racing Post:
 
 The Hong Kong Jockey Club - Introduction of The Cathay Pacific Jockey Club Cup (2011/12)
 Racing Information of The Cathay Pacific Jockey Club Cup (2011/12)
 The Hong Kong Jockey Club 

Horse races in Hong Kong
Recurring sporting events established in 2002
2002 establishments in Hong Kong